The Melal Orchestra is an orchestra founded in 2007 by Peyman Soltani in order to perform pieces of ancient Iranian musical heritage at twelve historical monuments around the world.

This orchestra that has been called the Persepolis Orchestra has benefited from the spiritual support of Iran cultural heritage organization, UNESCO National Commission and ICOM national committee.

However, due to changes in the policy and management of cultural heritage and its integration with tourism organizations in 2008, the name of the orchestra has been changed to Melal Orchestra and it started its activity, with 130 members, at the same year. The main goal of the orchestra is to spread empathy, companionship, and the juxtaposition of cultures, with the slogan of peace and friendship between nations.

The orchestra announced a formal recall of more than eight hundred musicians (students and distinguished music graduates) in order to choose its members. In this orchestra there is more than 30 different instruments (15 Iranian instruments having the role of melodic, rhythmic and accompaniment; and 15 symphonic instruments). The combination of these two instruments has given a unique flavour in the tone of the orchestral music.

Persian musical culture as a mystical culture and as the representative of a perfect Eastern thinking with introverted tendencies, in one hand and European musical culture following the culture of the Greek goddess of music, culture and Apollonian philosophy with Extroverted tendencies; have been incorporated in this orchestra.

The Melal Orchestra, with its different formation can achieve such lofty ideals to accomplish a common language. This orchestra strives to introduce new capabilities in the orchestra, with a large part of the repertoire of world music in hand and having a combinational tune, tries to spread a global perspective.

The first performance of the orchestra with the theme of "the young Iranian heritage" was performed in the Vahdat Hall.

The second performance with the theme of "Music and the glory of friendship" was in the Grand Hall of Interior Ministry and the third performance that was performed in the Open area of National Garden, has the theme of "the sacred land of Iran".

In its previous performances this orchestra played some popular parts from great musicians like Béla Bartók, Mozart, Grieg, Shostakovich, Priesner, Komitas and different cultural-ethnic music of Iran like Torbat-e Jam, Bushehr, Bakhtiyari, Azari and Lori.

See also
Iran's National Orchestra
Tehran Symphony Orchestra
Iranian Orchestra for New Music

External links 
 
The Rise of a Musical Giant in Iran

Persian orchestras
Iranian orchestras